Igor Petrovich Semshov (born 6 April 1978) is a Russian professional football coach and a former player. He is the manager of Chayka Peschanokopskoye.

Career
Semshov graduated from the CSKA academy in 1996, but was unable to hold a starting place and left for Torpedo Moscow in 1998 after only two seasons. He played well, and became one of the team's key players even earning a call up to the Russian National Team. In 2006, he was transferred to Dynamo Moscow and played there for two years but was put up for transfer in 2008 due to a failure to reach a contract agreement. On 15 December 2009 he moved to FC Zenit St. Petersburg for €4.5 million but returned to Dynamo the next season.

Career statistics

International career

Semshov was selected to play for the Russian national football team at the 2002 World Cup, but he did not manage to prevent a disappointing performance as he was played out of position on the left of midfield. He took a part at Euro 2004, but the tournament was a disappointment for him again. Russia fell at the first round and Semshov only played in the last match, which many felt was a poor decision.

He was again selected for Euro 2008. He scored his first goal in a friendly against Argentina.

He was confirmed for the finalized UEFA Euro 2012 squad on 25 May 2012.

International goals

Career honours

Club
Zenit St. Petersburg
Russian Cup (1): 2010

International
Russia
 UEFA European Championship bronze medalist: 2008

References

External links
Profile at the official FC Zenit St. Petersburg website

1978 births
Living people
Russian footballers
Russia international footballers
Russia under-21 international footballers
Association football midfielders
Footballers from Moscow
PFC CSKA Moscow players
FC Torpedo Moscow players
FC Torpedo-2 players
FC Dynamo Moscow players
FC Zenit Saint Petersburg players
PFC Krylia Sovetov Samara players
2002 FIFA World Cup players
UEFA Euro 2004 players
Russian Premier League players
UEFA Euro 2008 players
UEFA Euro 2012 players
Russian football managers
FC Khimik-Arsenal managers